The Ministry of Finance is a government ministry, responsible for the economy of Zimbabwe. The incumbent Finance Minister is Mthuli Ncube, who succeeded Patrick Chinamasa, while the Deputy Minister is Terence Mukupe. The Ministry of Finance oversees the Reserve Bank of Zimbabwe and the Zimbabwe National Revenue Authority.

See also
List of Finance Ministers of Zimbabwe
Ministry of Finance (Rhodesia)

References

Government of Zimbabwe
Economy of Zimbabwe
Zimbabwe